Hatsume no Tsubone (初芽局) is a fictitious Japanese woman from the Sengoku period. She is famous as the main character of the historical novel Sekigahara by Ryōtarō Shiba. In the novel, she is Kunoichi (female ninja) sent by Tokugawa Ieyasu to spy on his political enemy Ishida Mitsunari before the Battle of Sekigahara.

Narrative 
Hatsume was born in Iga Village, a village of Ninjas. Hatsume's father was a retainer of the Takeda clan. After her father's death, Hatsume went with her sister and mother to serve the Mogami clan. Hatsume was one of the maids of Komahime, the daughter of Mogami Yoshiaki.

In the 2017 film Sekigahara, based on Shiba's novel, Hatsume became a female ninja in Iga after serving as a maid of Toyotomi Hideyoshi's mother. She then fell in love with the character of Ishida Mitsunari and began working for him in the Western army. The director of the movie Masato Harada wanted to create a "boy meets a girl" type of romantic encounter.

Having served the Tokugawa, she walked freely in Edo to later inform Ieyasu's plans. After Hatsume betrayed Tokugawa Ieyasu and tried to kill him, Ieyasu had her condemned to death. She is said to have lodged at Sawayama castle in Omi province and has become a mistress of Mitsunari.

According to Shiba's novel, after Ishida Mitsunari's death at the Battle of Sekigahara, she disappeared from the historical records and her existence is debated.

Popular culture

Game 

She appeared in various games such as Puzzle and Dragons and Sengoku Taisen.

Movie 

 Hatsume (performed by Kasumi Arimura) was a protagonist character in ''Sekigahara'' film (2017).

Drama 

 Hatsume was starred by Keiko Matsuzaka in the TV series Sekigahara (1981).

References 

16th-century Japanese people
17th-century Japanese people
Japanese ninjutsu practitioners
Japanese nobility
Ninja
Women of medieval Japan
17th-century Japanese women
16th-century Japanese women
Women in 16th-century warfare
Women in 17th-century warfare
Japanese women in warfare
People of Sengoku-period Japan
People of Edo-period Japan
Female wartime spies